The white-fronted tit (Sittiparus semilarvatus) is a species of bird in the family Paridae.
It is endemic to the Philippines found in the islands of Luzon and Mindanao. Its natural habitat is tropical moist lowland forests.
It is threatened by habitat loss.

Description and Taxonomy 

EBird describes the bird as "A small, uncommon bird of lowland and foothill forest canopy and edge. Entirely dark with an obvious white mark from the forehead down between the bill and eye. Males are entirely black and females have dark brown underparts. Varies regionally, with Mindanao birds having an additional white mark in the wing. Unmistakable. Voice includes a downslurred series of three fairly high-pitched downslurred notes, “piu-piu piu.” Also gives a rapid staccato trill.." It is often seen in exposed branches in the canopy.

The white-fronted tit was formally described by the Italian ornithologist Tommaso Salvadori in 1865 under the binomial name Melaniparus semilarvatus. The species was formerly included in the genus Parus but was moved to Sittiparus when Parus was split into several resurrected genera following the publication of a detailed molecular phylogenetic analysis in 2013. The genus Sittiparus had originally been erected by the Belgium politician and naturalist Edmond de Sélys Longchamps in 1884 with the varied tit as the type species.

Subspecies 
There are three subspecies:
 S. s. snowi (Parkes, 1971) – north east Luzon; has white patch on the wing and less glossy appearance, females have white patches in its collar
 S. s. semilarvatus (Salvadori, 1865) – central and southern Luzon; 
 S. s. nehrkorni (Blasius, W, 1890) – Mindanao; similar to snowi but an even larger white patch on wing

Habitat and Conservation Status 

IUCN has assessed this bird as near threatened. This species' main threat is habitat loss with wholesale clearance of forest habitats as a result of logging, agricultural conversion and mining activities occurring within the range.

There are no species specific conservation measures but it does occur in protected areas like Northern Sierra Madre Natural Park and Bataan National Park.

References

white-fronted tit
Endemic birds of the Philippines
white-fronted tit
Taxonomy articles created by Polbot